The 1919–20 season was Chelsea Football Club's 11th of competitive football. It was also the first full English football season since the end of World War I. It proved to be Chelsea's most successful season to that point, as they finished 3rd in the First Division and reached the FA Cup semi-finals.

Table

Results

First Division

FA Cup

References
 Chelsea 1919/1920 results and fixtures  at Soccerbase
Hockings, Ron. 100 Years of the Blues: A Statistical History of Chelsea Football Club. (2007)

1919-20
English football clubs 1919–20 season